George Catlett Marshall Jr.  (December 31, 1880 – October 16, 1959) was an American army officer and statesman. He rose through the United States Army to become Chief of Staff of the U.S. Army under Presidents Franklin D. Roosevelt and Harry S. Truman, then served as Secretary of State and Secretary of Defense under Truman. Winston Churchill lauded Marshall as the "organizer of victory" for his leadership of the Allied victory in World War II. After the war, he spent a frustrating year trying and failing to avoid the impending Chinese Civil War. As Secretary of State, Marshall advocated a U.S. economic and political commitment to post-war European recovery, including the Marshall Plan that bore his name. In recognition of this work, he was awarded the Nobel Peace Prize in 1953.

Born in Pennsylvania, Marshall graduated from the Virginia Military Institute (VMI) in 1901. Marshall received his commission as a second lieutenant of Infantry in February 1902 and immediately went to the Philippines. He served in the United States and overseas in positions of increasing rank and responsibility, including platoon leader and company commander in the Philippines during the Philippine–American War. He was the Honor Graduate of his Infantry-Cavalry School Course in 1907, and graduated first in his 1908 Army Staff College class. In 1916 Marshall was assigned as aide-de-camp to J. Franklin Bell, the commander of the Western Department. After the nation entered World War I in 1917, Marshall served with Bell who commanded the Department of the East. He was assigned to the staff of the 1st Division; he assisted with the organization's mobilization and training in the United States, as well as planning of its combat operations in France. Subsequently, assigned to the staff of the American Expeditionary Forces headquarters, he was a key planner of American operations; including the Meuse-Argonne Offensive.

After the war, Marshall became an aide-de-camp to John J. Pershing, who was then the Army's Chief of Staff. Marshall later served on the Army staff, was the executive officer of the 15th Infantry Regiment in China, and was an instructor at the Army War College. In 1927, he became assistant commandant of the Army's Infantry School, where he modernized command and staff processes, which proved to be of major benefit during World War II. In 1932 and 1933 he commanded the 8th Infantry Regiment and Fort Screven, Georgia. Marshall commanded 5th Brigade, 3rd Infantry Division and Vancouver Barracks from 1936 to 1938; he received promotion to brigadier general. During this command, Marshall was also responsible for 35 Civilian Conservation Corps (CCC) camps in Oregon and Southern Washington. In July 1938, Marshall was assigned to the War Plans Division on the War Department staff; he later became the Army's Deputy Chief of Staff. When Chief of Staff Malin Craig retired in 1939, Marshall assumed the role of Chief of Staff in an acting capacity before his appointment to the position, which he held until the war's end in 1945.

As Chief of Staff, Marshall, working closely with Secretary of War Henry L. Stimson, organized the largest military expansion in U.S. history, and received promotion to five-star rank as General of the Army. Marshall coordinated Allied operations in Europe and the Pacific until the end of the war. In addition to accolades from Winston Churchill and other Allied leaders, Time magazine named Marshall its Man of the Year for 1943 and 1947. Marshall retired from active service in 1945, but remained on active duty, as required for holders of five-star rank. From December 15, 1945, to January 1947, Marshall served as a special envoy to China in an unsuccessful effort to negotiate a coalition government between the Nationalists of Chiang Kai-shek and the Communists of Mao Zedong.

As Secretary of State from 1947 to 1949, Marshall advocated rebuilding Europe, a program that became known as the Marshall Plan, and which led to his being awarded the 1953 Nobel Peace Prize. After resigning as Secretary of State, Marshall served as chairman of the American Battle Monuments Commission and president of the American National Red Cross. As Secretary of Defense at the start of the Korean War, Marshall worked to restore the military's confidence and morale at the end of its post-World War II demobilization and then its initial buildup for combat in Korea and operations during the Cold War. After resigning as Defense Secretary, Marshall retired to his home in Virginia. He died in 1959 and was buried with honors at Arlington National Cemetery.

Early life and education
George Catlett Marshall Jr. was born in Uniontown, Pennsylvania, the youngest of three children born to George Catlett Marshall and Laura Emily (née Bradford) Marshall. Both sides of his family were long from Kentucky, but cherished their Virginian roots. He was also a first cousin, three times removed, of former Chief Justice John Marshall. Marshall's father was active in the coal and coke business. Later, when asked about his political allegiances, Marshall often joked that his father had been a Democrat and his mother a Republican, whereas he was an Episcopalian.

Marshall was educated at Miss Alcinda Thompson's private school in Uniontown and spent a year at Uniontown's Central School. Having decided early in life that he desired a career in the military, but unlikely to obtain an appointment to the United States Military Academy because of his average grades, he looked to the Virginia Military Institute (VMI) for a formal education. Marshall's brother Stuart, a VMI alumnus, believed George would not succeed and argued that their mother should not let George attend out of concern that he would "disgrace the family name." Determined to "wipe his brother's face," Marshall enrolled at the age of sixteen in December 1897. To pay for his tuition and expenses, Marshall's mother sold parcels of land she owned in Uniontown and Augusta, Kentucky.

At the start of his college career, Marshall was subjected to a hazing incident in which upperclassmen positioned an unsheathed bayonet with the point up and directed him to squat over it. After twenty minutes, Marshall fainted and fell. When he awoke, he had a deep laceration to one of his buttocks. While being treated for his injury, Marshall refused to inform on his classmates. Impressed with his bravery, the hazers never bothered him again.

During his years at VMI, Marshall always ranked first in military discipline and about midway academically. He attained the rank of first captain, the highest a cadet could achieve, and graduated 15th of 34 in the Class of 1901. Marshall received a diploma, not a degree. At the time of his graduation, the top five or six VMI graduates received bachelor's degrees. The rest received diplomas attesting to their status as graduates. He played offensive tackle on the football team and in 1900 he was selected for All-Southern honors.

Early infantry career and the Philippines
Following his graduation from VMI, Marshall served as Commandant of Students at the Danville Military Institute in Danville, Virginia. He took a competitive examination for a commission in the United States Army, which had greatly expanded to deal with the Spanish–American War and Philippine–American War. Marshall passed, and used endorsements his father obtained from both of Pennsylvania's U.S. Senators to bolster his application. VMI Superintendent Scott Shipp also supported Marshall's application, and in a letter to President William McKinley compared him favorably to other VMI graduates serving in the Army, saying Marshall was "Fully the equal of the best." He was commissioned a second lieutenant of Infantry in February 1902. In a matter of days he married, resigned the Danville job, and shipped out to serve with the 30th Infantry Regiment in the Philippines.

Prior to World War I, Marshall received various postings in the United States and the Philippines, including serving as an infantry platoon leader and company commander during the Philippine–American War and other guerrilla uprisings. He was schooled in modern warfare, including a tours from 1906 to 1910 as both a student and an instructor. He was the Honor Graduate of his Infantry-Cavalry School Course (now the United States Army Command and General Staff College) in 1907, and graduated first in his 1908 Army Staff College (now the United States Army War College) class.

After another tour of duty in the Philippines, Marshall returned in 1916 to serve as aide-de-camp to Major General J. Franklin Bell, the commander of the Western Department and former Army chief of staff, at the Presidio of San Francisco. In the summer and fall of 1916, Marshall was responsible for organizing several Western Department Citizens' Military Training Camps. After the American entry into World War I in April 1917, Marshall relocated with Bell to Governors Island, New York, when Bell was reassigned as commander of the Department of the East. Shortly afterwards, Marshall was assigned to help oversee the mobilization of the 1st Division for service in France.

World War I

Shortly after the American entry into World War I in April 1917, Marshall had roles as a planner of both training and operations. In the summer, he was assigned as assistant chief of staff for operations on the staff of the newly created 1st Division. After overseeing the division's mobilization and organization in Texas, he departed for France with the division staff in mid-1917. On the long ocean voyage, his roommate was the division's assistant chief of staff for training, Major Lesley J. McNair; the two formed a personal and professional bond that they maintained for the rest of their careers. Marshall was the first passenger from the first boat transporting American Expeditionary Forces (AEF) soldiers to set foot in Europe, and one of the first to enter the trenches of the Western Front.

After arriving in France, Marshall served with the 1st Division on the St. Mihiel, Picardy, and Cantigny fronts. In late 1917, General John J. Pershing, the Commander-in-Chief (C-in-C) of the AEF, inspected the 1st Division. Unimpressed by what he observed, Pershing began to berate the division commander, Major General William L. Sibert, in front of his staff. Sibert took Pershing's criticism in silence, but when Pershing turned his attention to the division chief of staff, Marshall angrily interceded to inform Pershing of logistical and administrative difficulties of which Pershing was unaware. Marshall also informed Pershing that the AEF staff had not been very helpful in dealing with the problems. Sibert and his staff were concerned that Marshall's willingness to confront Pershing had probably cost him his career. Instead, Pershing began to seek out Marshall and ask for his advice whenever he visited the 1st Division.

Marshall won recognition and acclaim for his planning of the Battle of Cantigny, which took place from May 28 to 31, 1918; Marshall's success resulted in the first notable American victory of the war. As he conducted pre-attack planning, Marshall traveled alone under cover of darkness to personally view the terrain and mentally map it. Marshall ventured beyond the front lines and far into no-man's land, often under friendly artillery fire and routinely risking discovery and capture by Imperial German Army troops. On May 26, he was injured while traveling to several subordinate units to conduct pre-attack coordination.  As he departed the division headquarters area, his horse stumbled, fell, and rolled over; Marshall's left foot was caught in the stirrup, and he sustained a severe sprain and bruise. A physician bound Marshall's injured ankle and foot with adhesive tape so he could avoid medical evacuation and remain with the division to oversee the attack. In 1920, Marshall was awarded the Citation Star for his heroism during this battle. When the Silver Star medal was created in 1932, Citation Stars were converted to the new award.

In mid-1918, Pershing brought Marshall on to the AEF operations staff, G-3, where he worked closely with Pershing and was a key planner of American operations. He was instrumental in the planning and coordination of the Meuse-Argonne Offensive, which contributed to the defeat of the German Empire on the Western Front in 1918. Marshall held the permanent rank of captain and the temporary rank of colonel. He was recommended for promotion to temporary brigadier general in October 1918, but the Armistice occurred before the recommendation was acted on. After the Armistice, Marshall served as chief of staff for the U.S. Eighth Corps.

Between the wars

After the war, Marshall reverted to his permanent rank of captain. In 1919, he became an aide-de-camp to General Pershing. Between 1920 and 1924, while Pershing was Army Chief of Staff, Marshall worked on a number of projects that focused on training and teaching modern, mechanized warfare. He taught at the Army War College and was a key planner in the War Department. He then served as executive officer of the 15th Infantry Regiment in the Republic of China, where he remained for three years and learned to speak basic Mandarin. In 1927, as a lieutenant colonel, he was appointed assistant commandant of the Infantry School at Fort Benning, where he initiated major changes to modernize command and staff processes, which proved to be of major benefit during World War II. Marshall placed Edwin F. Harding in charge of the Infantry School's publications, and Harding became editor of Infantry in Battle, a book that codified the lessons of World War I. Infantry in Battle is still used as an officer's training manual in the Infantry Officer's Course and was the training manual for most of the infantry officers and leaders of World War II.

Marshall's first wife died in 1927. The following year, while stationed at Fort Benning, Marshall met Katherine Tupper Brown at a dinner party. They married on October 15, 1930, at Emmanuel Episcopal Church in Baltimore, Maryland. The wedding made headlines as General Pershing served as Marshall's best man.

From June 1932 to June 1933, Marshall was the commanding officer of the 8th Infantry Regiment at Fort Screven, Georgia. From July 1933 to October 1933 he was commander of Fort Moultrie, South Carolina, and District I of the Civilian Conservation Corps, and he was promoted to colonel in September 1933. During the Great Depression he became a strong supporter of President Franklin D. Roosevelt and the New Deal. He was senior instructor and chief of staff for the Illinois National Guard's 33rd Division from November 1933 to August 1936.

Marshall was promoted to general in 1936 and assigned to command the 5th Brigade of the 3rd Infantry Division and Vancouver Barracks in Vancouver, Washington, from 1936 to 1938, and was promoted to brigadier general in October 1936. In addition to obtaining a long-sought and significant troop command, traditionally viewed as an indispensable step to the pinnacle of the US Army, Marshall was also responsible for 35 Civilian Conservation Corps (CCC) camps in Oregon and southern Washington. As post commander Marshall made a concerted effort to cultivate relations with the city of Portland and to enhance the image of the US Army in the region. With the CCC, he initiated a series of measures to improve the morale of the participants and to make the experience beneficial in their later life. He started a newspaper for the CCC region that provided a vehicle to promote CCC successes, and he initiated a variety of programs that developed participants' skills and improved their health. Marshall's inspections of the CCC camps gave him and his wife Katherine the chance to enjoy the beauty of the American Pacific Northwest and made that assignment what he called "the most instructive service I ever had, and the most interesting."

In July 1938, Marshall was assigned to the War Plans Division in Washington, D.C., and subsequently reassigned as Deputy Chief of Staff. In that capacity, then-Brigadier General Marshall attended a White House conference at which President Franklin D. Roosevelt proposed a plan to expand the United States Army Air Corps by 15,000 aircraft per year in preparation for World War II. With all other attendees voicing support, Marshall was the only one to disagree, pointing out the lack of consideration for logistical support or training. Marshall also spoke in favor of a large ground army although Roosevelt had said a large air force would be a greater deterrent to enemies, pointing out that the United States Army did not yet have a single division at full operational strength. Despite others' belief then that Marshall had ended his career, his willingness to express disagreement resulted in Roosevelt nominating Marshall to be the Army Chief of Staff. At the time of the appointment, Marshall was only 34th in seniority, outranked by 21 major generals and 11 brigadier generals, but he was fifth under an unwritten rule that the chief of staff should be able to serve a four-year term before reaching the mandatory retirement age of 64.

Upon the retirement of General Malin Craig on July 1, 1939, Marshall became acting chief of staff. President Roosevelt favored Marshall because he was more supportive of New Deal liberalism than the conservative Douglas MacArthur, and because of the recommendations of Pershing, Craig, Louis A. Johnson, and most importantly Roosevelt's close advisor Harry Hopkins. Marshall was sworn in as chief of staff on September 1, 1939, just hours after the Wehrmacht launched its invasion of Poland. He held this post until retiring in November 1945.

On May 11, 1940, the United States Congress cut $10 million from a $28 million appropriation budget for equipment to detect Imperial Japanese Armed Forces aircraft off the West Coast of the United States. Marshall met with Secretary of the Treasury Henry Morgenthau Jr. and they went to see Roosevelt; Marshall emphasized the supreme importance of getting the full amount and told Roosevelt "you have got to do something and you've got to do it today". Marshall's advocacy worked and he got "all he wanted and more".

In 1941, Marshall became a Freemason, raised "at sight" by the Grand Master of the Grand Lodge of the District of Columbia. ("At sight" is the procedure by which a Grand Master confers on a candidate all three Masonic degrees - Apprentice, Fellowcraft, and Master - at one time.)

World War II

As Chief of Staff, Marshall organized the largest military expansion in U.S. history, inheriting an outmoded, poorly equipped army of 189,000 men and, partly drawing from his experience teaching and developing techniques of modern warfare as an instructor at the Army War College, coordinated the large-scale expansion and modernization of the U.S. Army. Under his name were produced significant works of doctrine such as Field Manual 100-5. During his first week in office he advised Roosevelt to issue an executive order expanding the Regular Army to 227,000 troops and the National Guard to 235,000 reservists, although the President could not immediately act because the United States Congress still favored isolationism.

Marshall's efforts to expand the United States Armed Forces began to have more success after the Axis powers conquered most of Western Europe in the Battle of France. Beginning in July 1940, he was greatly assisted in this effort by newly appointed Secretary of War Henry Stimson, who Marshall would gradually displace as the most significant leader of the U.S. military apparatus in a deviation from the United States' tradition of civilian control of the military. Though he had never actually led troops in combat, Marshall was a skilled organizer with a talent for inspiring other officers. Many of the American generals who were given top commands during the war were either picked or recommended by Marshall, including Dwight D. Eisenhower, Jacob L. Devers, George S. Patton, Terry de la Mesa Allen Sr., Lloyd Fredendall, Lesley J. McNair, Mark Wayne Clark and Omar Bradley.

Expands military force fortyfold

Faced with the necessity of turning an army of former civilians into a force of over eight million soldiers by 1942 (a fortyfold increase within three years), Marshall directed McNair as commander of Army Ground Forces to focus efforts on rapidly producing large numbers of soldiers. With the exception of airborne forces, Marshall approved McNair's concept of an abbreviated training schedule for men entering Army land forces training, particularly in regard to basic infantry skills, weapons proficiency, and combat tactics. At the time, most U.S. commanders at lower levels had little or no combat experience of any kind. Without the input of experienced British or Allied combat officers on the nature of modern warfare and enemy tactics, many resorted to formulaic training methods emphasizing static defense and orderly large-scale advances by motorized convoys over improved roads. In consequence, Army forces deploying to Africa in Operation Torch suffered serious initial reverses when encountering German armored combat units in Africa in the Battle of Kasserine Pass and other major battles. Even as late as 1944, U.S. soldiers undergoing stateside training in preparation for deployment against German forces in Europe were not being trained in combat procedures and tactics in use there.

Replacement system criticized

Originally, Marshall had planned a 265-division Army with a system of unit rotation such as practiced by the British and other Allies. By mid-1943, however, after pressure from government and business leaders to preserve manpower for industry and agriculture, he had abandoned this plan in favor of a 90-division Army using individual replacements sent via a circuitous process from training to divisions in combat. The individual replacement system devised by Marshall and implemented by McNair exacerbated problems with unit cohesion and effective transfer of combat experience to new soldiers and officers. In Europe, where there were few pauses in combat with German forces, the individual replacement system had broken down completely by late 1944. Hastily trained replacements or service personnel reassigned as infantry were often given only a few weeks' refresher training before being thrown into battle with Army divisions locked in front-line combat.

The new men were often not even proficient in the use of their own weapons, and once in combat, could not receive enough practical instruction from veterans before being killed or wounded, sometimes within the first few days. Under such conditions, many soldiers suffered a crippling loss of morale, while veterans were kept at the front until they were killed, wounded, or incapacitated by battle fatigue or illness. Incidents of soldiers going AWOL from combat duty as well as battle fatigue and self-inflicted injury rose rapidly during the last eight months of the war with Nazi Germany. As one historian concluded, "Had the Germans been given a free hand to devise a replacement system..., one that would do the Americans the most harm and the least good, they could not have done a better job."

Marshall's abilities to pick competent field commanders during the early part of the war was decidedly mixed. He was instrumental in advancing the careers of the highly capable generals such as Dwight D. Eisenhower, Omar Bradley, George S. Patton, Walter Krueger and Mark W. Clark. A notable exception was his recommendation of the swaggering Lloyd Fredendall to Eisenhower for a major command in the American invasion of North Africa during Operation Torch. Marshall was especially fond of Fredendall, describing him as "one of the best" and remarking in a staff meeting when his name was mentioned, "I like that man; you can see determination all over his face." Eisenhower duly picked him to command the 39,000-man Central Task Force (the largest of three) in Operation Torch. Both men would come to regret that decision, as Fredendall was the leader of U.S. Army forces at the disastrous Battle of Kasserine Pass.

Planned invasion of Europe

During World War II, Marshall was instrumental in preparing the U.S. Army and Army Air Forces for the invasion of Continental Europe. Marshall wrote the document that would become the central strategy for all Allied operations in Europe. During the Arcadia Conference he convinced the United Kingdom to accept this strategy, including the focus on defeating Germany first and the establishment of international unified commands in control of all Allied forces in a given theatre. His push for unity of command, in particular through the Combined Chiefs of Staff and the American-British-Dutch-Australian Command, was met with resistance from the British Armed Forces under Alan Brooke because the scheme would allow the United States to dominate the Western Allied war effort, but the British government ultimately approved.

He initially scheduled Operation Overlord for April 1, 1943, but met with strong opposition from Winston Churchill, who convinced Roosevelt to commit troops to Allied invasion of Sicily for the invasion of Italy. Some authors think that World War II could have ended earlier if Marshall had had his way; others think that such an invasion would have meant utter failure. Marshall and his advisors also opposed the Allied invasion of French North Africa after it became clear that Vichy France would offer resistance, concerns over an Axis intervention through Francoist Spain and Gibraltar, and suspicions that the operation was intended to defend European colonial territory with little strategic value to the war.

When rumors circulated that Marshall would become the Supreme Commander of Operation Overlord, many critics viewed the potential transfer as a demotion, since he would leave his position as Chief of Staff of the Army and lose his seat on the Combined Chiefs of Staff. While Marshall enjoyed considerable success in working with Congress and Roosevelt, he refused to lobby for the position. Roosevelt selected Eisenhower, in large part because he did not want to do without Marshall in the Chief of Staff position. He told Marshall, "I didn't feel I could sleep at ease if you were out of Washington."

On December 16, 1944, Marshall became the first American Army general to be promoted to the newly created rank of General of the Army, a five-star rank that is the American equivalent of field marshal. He was the second American to be promoted to a five-star rank, as William Leahy was promoted to fleet admiral the previous day.

Throughout the remainder of World War II, Marshall coordinated Allied operations in Europe and the Pacific. He was characterized as the organizer of Allied victory by Churchill. Time magazine named Marshall Man of the Year for 1943. Marshall resigned his post of chief of staff on November 18, 1945, but did not retire, as regulations stipulate that Generals of the Army remain on active duty for life. He was succeeded as Army chief of staff by General of the Army Dwight Eisenhower.

Analysis of Pearl Harbor intelligence failure

After World War II ended, the Congressional Joint Committee on the Investigation of the Pearl Harbor Attack received testimony on the intelligence failure. It amassed 25,000 pages of documents, 40 volumes, and included nine reports and investigations, eight of which had been previously completed. These reports included criticism of Marshall for delay in sending General Walter Short, the Army commander in Hawaii, important information obtained from intercepted Japanese diplomatic messages. The report also criticized Marshall's lack of knowledge of the readiness of the Hawaiian Command during November and December 1941. Marshall also advised President Roosevelt to move part of the United States Pacific Fleet to the Atlantic Ocean to assist Neutrality Patrols, and that the defenses at Oahu made a Japanese attack on the island impossible. These recommendations were dismissed by the President, but could have been catastrophic if they had not been.

Ten days after the attack, Lt. General Short and Admiral Husband E. Kimmel, commander of the United States Pacific Fleet at Naval Station Pearl Harbor, were both relieved of their duties. The final report of the Joint Committee did not single out or fault Marshall. While the report was critical of the overall situation, the committee noted that subordinates had failed to pass on important information to their superiors, including to Marshall.

A secret review of the Army's role, which resulted in the Clausen Report, was authorized by Secretary Henry Stimson. The report was critical of Short and also of Colonel Rufus S. Bratton of the Military Intelligence Division (G-2), who investigator Henry Clausen concluded arrived at the War Department later on the morning of December 7, 1941, than he initially claimed during testimony, and invented a story about a warning to affected army commanders about the imminent Pearl Harbor Attack being delayed because he had been unable to get in touch with Marshall, an allegation which "nearly destroyed" Marshall.

Post war: China

In December 1945, President Harry Truman dispatched Marshall to the Republic of China, where he had served in the 1920s. His new mission was to prevent a resumption of the Chinese Civil War by brokering a coalition government between America's Kuomintang allies under Generalissimo Chiang Kai-shek and the Chinese Communist Party of Mao Zedong. Marshall had no leverage over the Communists, but threatened to withdraw American aid essential to the Nationalists. Both sides rejected his proposals and he returned to the United States in January 1947. As Secretary of State, Marshall disagreed with the Defense and State Department views that Chiang's success was vital to American interests, insisting that U.S. troops not become involved. The war continued, and the Communists won in 1949.

Secretary of State
After Marshall's return to the U.S. in early 1947, Truman appointed him Secretary of State. As one of the most well-regarded and least politicized national leaders, he made an ideal front office personality. He became the spokesman for the State Department's ambitious plans to rebuild Europe. He did not design the plans, and paid little attention to details or negotiations. He did not keep current on details of foreign affairs. As one biographer notes, he had never been a workaholic. He turned over major responsibilities to his deputies, especially Under-Secretary Robert A. Lovett, and refused to be troubled by minutiae. By 1948, with frailties building up, his participation was further curtailed. Marshall said, "The fact of the matter is that Lovett bears the principal burden as I get away whenever possible."

On June 5, 1947, in a speech at Harvard University, he outlined the American proposal. The European Recovery Program, as it was formally known, became known as the Marshall Plan. Clark Clifford had suggested to Truman that the plan be called the Truman Plan, but Truman immediately dismissed that idea and insisted that it be called the Marshall Plan. The Marshall Plan would help Europe rebuild and modernize its economy along American lines, and open up new opportunities for international trade. Stalin ordered his satellites in Eastern Europe not to participate. Marshall was again named "Man of the Year" by Time in January 1948.

Truman repeatedly rejected Marshall's advice on Middle Eastern policy. As Secretary of State, Marshall strongly opposed recognizing the newly formed state of Israel. Marshall felt that if the state of Israel was declared, a war would break out in the Middle East (which it did when the 1948 Arab–Israeli War began one day after Israel declared independence). Marshall saw recognizing the Jewish state as a political move to gain American Jewish support in the upcoming election, in which Truman was expected to lose to Thomas E. Dewey. He told President Truman in May 1948, "If you (recognize the state of Israel) and if I were to vote in the election, I would vote against you." However, Marshall refused to vote in any election as a matter of principle.

During his tenure as Secretary of State, Marshall also urged Truman to immediately call for The Netherlands to stop their invasion of Indonesia, a former Dutch colony which had declared independence in 1945. The Netherlands ignored the Truman administration's initial entreaties. As a result, the Marshall Plan program for the Netherlands' economic recovery was put on hold and the Truman administration threatened to cut all economic aid. The Netherlands finally agreed to withdraw and transferred sovereignty following the Dutch–Indonesian Round Table Conference in 1949.

Marshall resigned as Secretary of State because of ill health on January 7, 1949. He was severely exhausted throughout his tenure in the position. Dean Acheson in late 1947 said he was underperforming like "a four-engine bomber going only on one engine." Truman named him to the largely honorific positions of chairman of the American Battle Monuments Commission and president of the American National Red Cross. He received the 1953 Nobel Peace Prize for his post-war work, despite the criticism that he was a warrior not a pacifist.

Secretary of Defense

When the early months of the Korean War showed how poorly prepared the Defense Department was, President Truman fired Secretary Louis A. Johnson and named Marshall as Secretary of Defense in September 1950. The appointment required a congressional waiver because the National Security Act of 1947 prohibited a uniformed military officer from serving in the post. This prohibition included Marshall since individuals promoted to General of the Army are not technically retired, but remain officially on active duty. Marshall was the first person to be granted such a waiver; in 2017, Jim Mattis became the second and in January 2021, General Lloyd Austin became the third. Marshall's main role as Secretary of Defense was to restore confidence and morale to the Defense Department while rebuilding the United States Armed Forces following their post-World War II demobilization.

Korean War

Marshall worked to provide more manpower to meet the demands of both the Korean War and the Cold War in Europe. To implement his priorities Marshall brought in a new leadership team, including Robert A. Lovett as his deputy and Anna M. Rosenberg, former head of the War Manpower Commission, as assistant secretary of defense for manpower. He also worked to rebuild the relationship between the Defense and State Departments, as well as the relationship between the Secretary of Defense and the Joint Chiefs of Staff.

Marshall participated in the post-Inchon landing discussion that led to authorizing Douglas MacArthur to conduct the UN offensive into North Korea. A secret "eyes only" signal from Marshall to MacArthur on September 29, 1950, declared the Truman administration's commitment: "We want you to feel unhampered strategically and tactically to proceed north of the 38th Parallel". At the same time, Marshall advised against public pronouncements which might lead to United Nations votes undermining or countermanding the initial mandate to restore the border between North and South Korea. Marshall and the Joint Chiefs of Staff were generally supportive of MacArthur because they were of the view that field commanders should be able to exercise their best judgment in accomplishing the intent of their superiors.

Following Chinese military intervention in Korea during late November, Marshall and the Joint Chiefs of Staff sought ways to aid MacArthur while avoiding all-out war with China. In the debate over what to do about China's increased involvement, Marshall opposed a cease–fire on the grounds that it would make the U.S. look weak in China's eyes, leading to demands for future concessions. In addition, Marshall argued that the U.S. had a moral obligation to honor its commitment to South Korea. When British Prime Minister Clement Attlee suggested diplomatic overtures to China, Marshall opposed, arguing that it was impossible to negotiate with the Communist government. In addition, Marshall expressed concern that concessions to China would undermine confidence in the U.S. among its Asian allies, including Japan and the Philippines. When some in Congress favored expanding the war in Korea and confronting China, Marshall argued against a wider war in Korea, continuing instead to stress the importance of containing the Soviet Union during the Cold War battle for primacy in Europe.

Relief of General MacArthur

Increasingly concerned about public statements from MacArthur, commander of United Nations Command forces fighting in the Korean War, which contradicted President Truman's on prosecution of the war, on the morning of April 6, 1951, Truman held a meeting with Marshall, Chairman of the Joint Chiefs of Staff Omar Bradley, Secretary of State Dean Acheson and advisor W. Averell Harriman to discuss whether MacArthur should be removed from command.

Harriman was emphatically in favor of MacArthur's relief, but Bradley opposed it. Marshall asked for more time to consider the matter. Acheson was in favor but did not disclose this, instead warning Truman that if he did it, MacArthur's relief would cause "the biggest fight of your administration." At another meeting the following day, Marshall and Bradley continued to oppose MacArthur's relief. On April 8, the Joint Chiefs of Staff met with Marshall, and each expressed the view that MacArthur's relief was desirable from a "military point of view," suggesting that "if MacArthur were not relieved, a large segment of our people would charge that civil authorities no longer controlled the military."

Marshall, Bradley, Acheson and Harriman met with Truman again on April 9. Bradley informed the President of the views of the Joint Chiefs, and Marshall added that he agreed with them. Truman wrote in his diary that "it is of unanimous opinion of all that MacArthur be relieved. All four so advise." (The Joint Chiefs would later insist that they had only "concurred" with the relief, not "recommended" it.)

On April 11, 1951, President Truman directed transmittal of an order to MacArthur, issued over Bradley's signature, relieving MacArthur of his assignment in Korea and directing him to turn over command to Matthew Ridgway. In line with Marshall's view, and those of the Joint Chiefs of Staff, MacArthur's relief was looked upon by proponents as being necessary to reassert the tenet of civilian control of the military.

Later life

Retirement
In September 1951, after 49 years of continuous public service, Marshall retired to his home, Dodona Manor, in Leesburg, Virginia. Purchased by the Marshalls in 1941, Dodona had previously served as a quiet weekend retreat for the busy couple. The home was restored beginning in the 1990s and the house and its gardens are open to the public as a museum.

It was at Dodona Manor that Marshall enjoyed his favorite food, roast leg of lamb, and his favorite beverage, an old fashioned. Gardening was one of Marshall's favorite pastimes, and in retirement he grew vegetables throughout the year, including tomatoes and pumpkins, while Katherine Marshall enjoyed tending to her rose garden. In a 1942 letter to David Burpee, president of the W. Atlee Burpee & Company, Marshall wrote, "The business of seeds and flowers tantalizes me because I have been an amateur gardener, both flower and vegetable, since a boy of ten. There is nothing I would so much prefer to do this spring as to turn my mind to the wholesome business of gardening rather than the terrible problems and tragedies of war."

Katherine's love of roses was well known, leading inventor Eugene S. Boerner to create the Katherine Tupper Marshall Rose, a pink hybrid tea rose. It was patented by Jackson and Perkins in 1943.

American Battle Monuments Commission
Throughout his retirement, Marshall served as chairman of the American Battle Monuments Commission. He oversaw the construction of fourteen cemeteries in eight countries following World War II to memorialize those killed or missing in battle. In the early 1950s, Marshall argued for the speedy construction and funding of cemeteries despite budget and staff cuts for the Korean War. Marshall wrote to General Joseph McNarney in March 1951 saying, "I am naturally hesitant to become personally involved in individual personnel problems, but in this case, am deeply concerned about the overall moral factor if our foreign national cemeteries are not adequately maintained...." Marshall's efforts to secure building and maintenance staff for the cemeteries were successful, doubling the number of military officers assigned to the work. On September 13, 1952, Marshall attended the dedication ceremony of Suresnes American Cemetery in France.

Coronation of Queen Elizabeth II
After retiring, Marshall largely withdrew from public life. A notable exception was in June 1953, when he accepted President Eisenhower's appointment to head the American delegation to the coronation of Queen Elizabeth II. The delegation included Earl Warren and Omar Bradley, and according to Bradley, as Marshall walked up the aisle of Westminster Abbey to take his seat before the ceremony, the audience rose to its feet as a gesture of respect. Marshall looked behind him to see who the arriving dignitary was, then realized the audience had stood for him. Marshall was also invited to the post-ceremony banquet at Buckingham Palace, and was the only non-royal seated at Queen Elizabeth's table.

Family life

George Marshall was the youngest of three siblings. His older brother Stuart Bradford Marshall (1875–1956) was a graduate of the Virginia Military Institute, and became a manager and executive in several metal production corporations, including the American Manganese Manufacturing Company. He later worked as a metallurgist and consulting engineer specializing in the production and operation of blast furnaces, coke ovens, and foundries. George and Stuart Marshall were long estranged because George married Lily Coles, who a few years before had rejected Stuart's proposal. When Stuart found out George was engaged to Lily, Stuart made unkind remarks about her, and George "cut him off my list." Marshall's sister, Marie Louise (1876–1962) was the wife of Dr. John Johnson Singer, an Army physician who died in 1934.

On February 11, 1902, Marshall married Elizabeth Carter "Lily" Coles at her mother's home in Lexington, Virginia. Marshall met Lily after listening to her play the piano across the street from VMI. Marshall, being immediately smitten, would "run the block," or leave barracks after hours, to be with her. After traveling abroad to Japan, Korea, and China with Marshall, Lily returned to the U.S. to have a goiter removed. She died on September 15, 1927, after thyroid surgery that strained her weak heart. They did not have children.

On October 15, 1930, Marshall married Katherine Boyce Tupper (October 8, 1882 – December 18, 1978); They had no children, but she was the mother of three children with Baltimore lawyer Clifton Stevenson Brown. He had been murdered by a disgruntled client in 1928. The second Mrs. Marshall was a graduate of the American Academy of Dramatic Arts; she later studied at the Comédie-Française, and toured with Frank Benson's English Shakespearean Company. She authored a memoir in 1946, Together: Annals of an Army Wife.

One of Marshall's stepsons, Allen Tupper Brown, was an Army lieutenant who was killed in Italy on May 29, 1944. Another stepson was Major Clifton Stevenson Brown Jr. (1914–1952). Stepdaughter Molly Brown Winn, the mother of actress Kitty Winn, was married to Colonel James Julius Winn, who had been an aide to Marshall. Molly Winn was active in preserving Marshall's legacy, including preserving Dodona Manor and publishing Marshall's World War I memoirs.

Death and burial

After a series of strokes, Marshall died at Walter Reed Hospital in Washington, D.C., on October 16, 1959. Although he was entitled to official proceedings, Marshall preferred simplicity, so he received a special military funeral that dispensed with many of the usual activities. The ceremonies included lying in state at Washington National Cathedral for 24 hours, guarded by representatives from each U.S. armed service and a VMI cadet.

President Eisenhower ordered flags flown at half-staff, and was among the 200 guests invited for the funeral service held at Fort Myer. Other dignitaries included former President Truman, Secretary of State Christian A. Herter, former Secretary of State Dean Acheson, former Governor W. Averell Harriman and Generals Omar N. Bradley, Alfred M. Gruenther, and Matthew B. Ridgway. His parish priest, Franklin Moss Jr., from St. James Episcopal Church in Leesburg conducted the chapel and graveside services, assisted by former chief chaplain and National Cathedral Canon the Reverend Luther Miller. In accordance with Marshall's wishes, there was no eulogy. Following the burial service, an artillery battery fired a 19-gun salute and a bugler played taps. The flag that draped Marshall's casket was folded and given to Mrs. Marshall by a VMI cadet.

Marshall was buried at Arlington National Cemetery, Section 7, Grave 8198, beside his first wife and her mother, Elizabeth Pendleton Coles (1849–1929). His second wife was also buried with him after she died on December 18, 1978. On its reverse side, the marble headstone lists General Marshall's positions held: "Chief of Staff U.S. Army, Secretary of State, President of American Red Cross, Secretary of Defense." The five-star rank adorns both sides of the stone.

Reputation and legacy

As William Taylor and other historians have recently emphasized, George Marshall was the best-known and most active – and most selfless – American leader in the early Cold War. His leadership had a distinct, signature style  which contained "Disdain for false speaking and dissembling", "Aura of Authority" and "Immensity of Integrity". He viewed his world in definitive black and white with no vagueness in arguments or gray areas in decision-making. Marshall is best known for giving his name and prestige to the Marshall Plan to rebuild the European economy. However, he suffered several defeats – he failed in the year-long effort to resolve the Chinese Civil War; he was defeated in his proposal to impose universal military service on all American men; and he was overruled by President Truman when he opposed the recognition of Israel. Historians agree that Truman depended heavily upon Marshall's prestige at a time of intensely bitter partisanship. Wilson Miscamble points to Marshall's delayed recognition of the threat posed by the Soviet Union – not until April 1947 did he realize the dangers. Miscamble concludes that recent studies show that Marshall was:An important contributor but hardly a dominant figure in the making of postwar American foreign policy. He had a special gift for delegation and he drew forth impressive contributions from various capable subordinates.
Marshall's reputation for excellence as a military organizer and planner was recognized early in his career, and became known throughout the Army. In a performance appraisal prepared while Marshall was a lieutenant in the Philippines, his superior, Captain E. J. Williams responded to the routine question of whether he would want the evaluated officer to serve under his command again by writing of Marshall "Should the exigencies of active service place him in exalted command I would be glad to serve under him." (Emphasis added.)

In 1916, Lieutenant Colonel Johnson Hagood completed a written evaluation of Marshall's performance in which he called Marshall a military genius. Responding to the question of whether he would want his subordinate Marshall to serve under him again, Hagood wrote "Yes, but I would prefer to serve under his command." (Emphasis added.) Hagood went on to recommend Marshall's immediate promotion to brigadier general, despite the fact that there were more than 1,800 officers, including Hagood, who were senior to him.

After the surrender of the Nazi German government in May 1945, Henry L. Stimson, the Secretary of War, paid tribute to Marshall in front of a gathering of members of the Army staff, concluding with: "I have seen a great many soldiers in my lifetime and you, Sir, are the finest soldier I have ever known."

Historians credit the high regard others had for Marshall's personal integrity as another reason for his positive legacy. In addition to his willingness to confront Pershing over Pershing's berating of the 1st Division chief of staff during World War I, Marshall cited other instances where he provided persistent advice that kept Pershing from creating needless controversy. In one, Marshall recalled a time when Pershing and James Harbord intended to change a War Department policy implemented by Peyton March, the chief of staff of the Army and Pershing's nominal superior, with whom Pershing had a long-running feud. Marshall counseled against it several times, and Pershing angrily indicated that his chief of staff Harbord and he intended to submit their proposal despite Marshall's advice. Rather than concede, Marshall replied that Pershing was letting his personal feud with March cloud his judgment and that Harbord, who also disliked March, was doing the same. Instead of continuing to "pull rank," Pershing yielded to Marshall's judgment and said "Well, have it your own way."

In another incident that highlighted Marshall's reputation for integrity, when President Franklin Roosevelt, a former Assistant Secretary of the Navy, favored the Navy during World War II planning, Marshall suggested that Roosevelt stop referring to the Navy as "us" and the Army as "them." Roosevelt laughed, but Marshall's humorous protest had made its point.

In addition to his military success, Marshall is primarily remembered as the driving force behind the Marshall Plan, which provided billions of dollars in aid to post war Europe to restart the economies of the destroyed countries. In recent years, the cooperation required between former European adversaries as part of the Marshall Plan has been recognized as one of the earliest factors that led to European integration beginning with the formation of the European Coal and Steel Community, and eventually the formation of the European Union.

In a television interview after leaving office, Truman was asked which American he thought had made the greatest contribution of the preceding thirty years. Without hesitation, Truman picked Marshall, adding "I don't think in this age in which I have lived, that there has been a man who has been a greater administrator; a man with a knowledge of military affairs equal to General Marshall."

Orson Welles said in a 1970 interview with Dick Cavett that "Marshall is the greatest man I ever met... I think he was the greatest human being who was also a great man... He was a tremendous gentleman, an old fashioned institution which isn't with us anymore." The story Welles related to Cavett to illustrate his point was about a time he saw Marshall take the time to speak with a young, overawed American soldier who had accidentally entered the same room.

Tributes and memorials

Two non-profit organizations, the George C. Marshall Foundation and the George C. Marshall International Center, actively propagate General Marshall's legacy. The Marshall Foundation oversees Marshall's official papers and over two million other documents relating to the 20th century. The International Center preserves Marshall's home, Dodona Manor, as a museum and hosts educational programs focusing on Marshall's life, leadership, and role in American history.

Numerous streets are named for General Marshall, including George-Marshall-Straße in Wiesbaden, Germany and George-C.-Marshall-Ring in Oberursel, Germany.

On April 30, 1998, the George C. Marshall European Center for Security Studies unveiled the first public statue of General Marshall in Europe in Garmisch-Partenkirchen, Germany. The slightly larger-than-life statue was sponsored by the Marshall Center, the Friends of the Marshall Center and the City of Garmisch-Partenkirchen. It shows Marshall in uniform walking across a bronze bridge, facing east, to greet new friends and allies and was designed by artist Christiane Horn of Wartenberg, Bavaria. Vernon A. Walters, former U.S. ambassador to Germany, was a keynote speaker during the dedication ceremony.

Gallery

Fictional portrayals
Marshall has been played in film and television by:
 Keith Andes in the 1970 film Tora! Tora! Tora!
 Ward Costello in the 1977 film MacArthur.
 Dana Andrews in the 1979 film Ike, The War Years.
 Bill Morey in the 1980 television film Enola Gay: The Men, the Mission, the Atomic Bomb.
 Norman Burton in the 1988 miniseries War and Remembrance.
 Hal Holbrook in the 1989 television film Day One.
 Harris Yulin in the 1995 television movie Truman.
 Harve Presnell in the 1998 film Saving Private Ryan.
 Scott Wilson in the 2001 film Pearl Harbor.
 Donald Eugene McCoy in the 2009 Chinese movie The Founding of a Republic.

Dates of rank

Marshall's dates of rank were:

Note – Marshall relinquished his active duty status when he became secretary of state in January 1947. He was returned to active duty upon leaving office in January 1949.

Awards and decorations

Civilian honors

Honorary degrees

See also

 German Marshall Fund
 George C. Marshall European Center for Security Studies
 George C. Marshall Foundation
 USS George C. Marshall (SSBN-654)
Marshall Scholarship
George C. Marshall's Dodona Manor
George C. Marshall High School
George C. Marshall Space Flight Center

Notes

References

Works cited

Books

 
 
 . Electronic version based on The Papers of George Catlett Marshall, vol. 2, "We Cannot Delay," July 1, 1939 – December 6, 1941 (Baltimore and London: The Johns Hopkins University Press, 1986), p. 616 [Pentagon Office, Selected Correspondence, Box 69, Folder 18. Holding ID: 2-553].

Periodicals

News & Media
 
 
 
 
 
 
 
 
 
 
 
 
 
 
 
 
 
 
 
 
 
 
 
 
 
 
 
 
 
 
 
 
 
 
 
 
 
 
 
 
 
 
 
 
 
 
 
 
 
 
 
 
 
 
 
 
 
 
 
 
 
 
 
 
 
 
 
 
 
 
 
 
 
 
 
 
 
 
 
 
 
 
 
 
 
 
 
 
 
 
 
 
 *

Further reading

 Aldrich, Edward Farley. "The Partnership: George Marshall, Henry Stimson, and the Extraordinary Collaboration that Won World War II." (Stackpole Books, 2022)
 Alperovitz, Gar, Robert L. Messer, and Barton J. Bernstein. "Marshall, Truman, and the decision to drop the bomb." International Security 16.3 (1991): 204–221. online
 Brower, Charles F. George C. Marshall: Servant of the American Nation (Palgrave Macmillan, 2011) Excerpt.
 Bryan, Ferald J. "George C. Marshall at Harvard: A Study of the Origins and Construction of the 'Marshall Plan' Speech." Presidential Studies Quarterly (1991): 489–502. online 
 Clarcq, J., DeMartino, R., & Palanski, M. E. "George C. Marshall: An enduring model of leadership effectiveness" Journal of Character and Leadership Integration (2011). 2:17–34.
Cray, Ed. General of the Army: George C. Marshall, Soldier and Statesman (W.W. Norton & Company, 1990)
 Findling, John E. and Frank W. Thackeray eds. Statesmen Who Changed the World: A Bio-Bibliographical Dictionary of Diplomacy (Greenwood, 1993) pp 337–45.
 Friedrich, Tamara L., et al. "Collectivistic leadership and George C. Marshall: A historiometric analysis of career events." Leadership Quarterly 25.3 (2014): 449–467. online
 Gullan, Harold I. "Expectations of Infamy: Roosevelt and Marshall Prepare for War, 1938–41." Presidential Studies Quarterly Volume: 28#3 1998. Pages 510+ online edition
 Higginbotham, Don. "George Washington and George Marshall: Some Reflections on the American Military Tradition" (U.S. Air Force Academy, 1984) online.
 Hopkins, Michael F. "President Harry Truman's Secretaries of State: Stettinius, Byrnes, Marshall and Acheson." Journal of Transatlantic Studies 6.3 (2008): 290–304.
 Jordan, Jonathan W., American Warlords: How Roosevelt's High Command Led America to Victory in World War II (NAL/Caliber 2015).
 Kurtz-Phelan, Daniel. The China Mission: George Marshall's Unfinished War, 1945-1947 (W.W. Norton & Company, 2018) online review
 May, Ernest R. "1947–48: When Marshall Kept the U.S. Out of War in China". Journal of Military History 2002 66(4): 1001–10. 
 Levine, Steven I. "A New Look at American Mediation in the Chinese Civil War: the Marshall Mission and Manchuria." Diplomatic History 1979 3(4): 349–375. 
 Marshall, George C. Selected Speeches and Statements. Ed. Harvey A. DeWeerd (Infantry Journal, 1945).
 Munch, P. G. "General George C. Marshall and the Army staff: A study in the effectiveness of staff leadership". Military Review. (1994). 74:14–23
 Nelsen, J. T. "General George C. Marshall: Strategic leadership and the challenges of reconstituting the Army, 1939–1941" in Professional Readings in Military Strategy (Strategic Studies Institute, U.S. Army War College, 1993) 7: 1–95.
 Olsen, Howard A. "George C. Marshall, emergence of a politician, 1 September 1939 to 6 December 1941" (Army Command And General Staff College, 1990) online
 Parrish, Thomas. Roosevelt and Marshall: Partners in Politics and War .(W. Morrow, 1989). 608
 Perry, Mark. Partners in Command: George Marshall and Dwight Eisenhower in War and Peace. (Penguin Press, 2007)
 Forrest Pogue, Viking, (1963–87) Four-volume authorized biography: complete text is online
 George C. Marshall: Education of a General, 1880–1939
 George C Marshall: Ordeal and Hope, 1939–1943
 George C. Marshall: Organizer of Victory 1943–1945
 George C. Marshall: Statesman 1945–1959
 Pops, Gerald. "The ethical leadership of George C. Marshall." Public Integrity 8.2 (2006): 165–185. Online
 Puryear Jr., Edgar F. 19 Stars: A Study in Military Character and Leadership. (Presidio Press, 2003)
  Roberts, Andrew. Masters and Commanders: How Four Titans Won the War In the West, 1941-1945 (Harper, 2009) (Online free to borrow)
 Steele, Richard W. The First Offensive, 1942: Roosevelt, Marshall, and the Making of American Strategy. (Indiana University Press, 1973)
 Stoler, Mark C. George C. Marshall: Soldier-Statesman of the American Century. (Twayne, 1989) 252
 Taaffe, Stephen R. Marshall and His Generals: U.S. Army Commanders in World War II. (University Press of Kansas, 2011) excerpt
Thompson, Rachel Yarnell. Marshall: A Statesman Shaped in the Crucible of War. (George C. Marshall International Center, 2014). 
 Unger, Debi and Irwin with Stanley Hirshson. George Marshall: a Biography. (Harper, 2014). 
 Weissman, Alexander D. "Pivotal politics—The Marshall Plan: A turning point in foreign aid and the struggle for democracy." History Teacher 47.1 (2013): 111–129. online, for middle and high school students
 Widener, Jeffrey M. "From General to Diplomat: The Success and Failure of George C. Marshall's Mission to China after World War II." Chinese Historical Review 27.1 (2020): 32–49.

Primary sources
 The Papers of George Catlett Marshall: (Larry I. Bland and Sharon Ritenour Stevens, eds.) online edition
 Vol. 1: "The Soldierly Spirit," December 1880 – June 1939. (1981)
 Vol. 2: "We Cannot Delay," July 1, 1939 – December 6, 1941. (1986)
 Vol. 3: "The Right Man for the Job," December 7, 1941 – May 31, 1943. (1991)
 Vol. 4: "Aggressive and Determined Leadership," June 1, 1943 – December 31, 1944. (1996)
 Vol. 5: "The Finest Soldier," January 1, 1945 – January 7, 1947. (2003)
 Vol. 6: "The Whole World Hangs in the Balance," January 8, 1947 – September 30, 1949. (2012)
 Vol. 7: "The Man of the Age," October 1, 1949 – October 16, 1959. (2016)
 Bland, Larry; Jeans, Roger B.; and Wilkinson, Mark, ed. George C. Marshall's Mediation Mission to China, December 1945 – January 1947. Lexington, Va.: George C. Marshall Found., 1998. 661
 Marshall, George C. George C. Marshall: Interviews and Reminiscences for Forrest C. Pogue. Lexington, Va.: George C. Marshall Found., 1991. 698 online edition

External links
 
 The Marshall Foundation
The George C. Marshall International Center
 George C. Marshall Center, Garmisch Germany 
 The Marshall Plan Speech MP3
 The Marshall Films Collection
 Marshall Scholarships
 The Marshall Plan Speech
 "George C. Marshall: Soldier of Peace" (Smithsonian Institution)
 Annotated bibliography for George Marshall from the Alsos Digital Library for Nuclear Issues
 The Last Salute: Civil and Military Funeral, 1921–1969, Chapter XIX, General of the Army George C. Marshall, Special Military Funeral, 16 – October 20, 1959  by B. C. Mossman and M. W. Stark. United States Army Center of Military History, 1991. CMH Pub 90–1.
 The George C. Marshall Index at the Franklin D. Roosevelt Presidential Library and Museum, Part 1 and Part 2
 Task Force Marshall Information Page
 Joint Committee on The Investigation of Pearl Harbor, 79th Congress
 
 
 
Generals of World War II
United States Army Officers 1939–1945

1880 births
1959 deaths
United States Secretaries of State
United States Secretaries of Defense
United States Army Chiefs of Staff
United States Army generals
American five-star officers
American Episcopalians
American humanitarians
American Freemasons
American Nobel laureates
American people of World War II
Burials at Arlington National Cemetery
Cold War diplomats
People from Leesburg, Virginia
People from Uniontown, Pennsylvania
People of the Chinese Civil War
Nobel Peace Prize laureates
Congressional Gold Medal recipients
Recipients of the Distinguished Service Medal (US Army)
Recipients of the Silver Star
Knights of the Order of Saints Maurice and Lazarus
Grand Croix of the Légion d'honneur
Recipients of the Croix de Guerre (France)
Grand Crosses of the Order of George I with Swords
Knights Grand Cross of the Order of Orange-Nassau
Recipients of the Order of Suvorov, 1st class
2 Marshall, George
Honorary Knights Grand Cross of the Order of the Bath
Truman administration cabinet members
20th-century American politicians
Virginia Independents
Anti-Zionism in the United States
George C.
Military personnel from Pennsylvania
United States Army Command and General Staff College alumni
United States Army War College alumni
VMI Keydets football players
20th-century American diplomats
Recipients of the Legion of Honour
Time Person of the Year
United States Army generals of World War II
United States Army personnel of World War I
United States Army Infantry Branch personnel
Virginia Military Institute alumni
Members of the American Philosophical Society